Ayub Khan is a compound masculine name; Ayub is the Arabic version of the name of the Biblical figure Job, while Khan or Khaan is  taken from the title used first by the Mongol rulers and then, in particular, their Islamic and Persian-influenced successors in South Asia, where the name is usually found, although Khan was being used before outside South Asia.

Given name
 Ayub Khan (Kipchak leader) (died 1117), ruler of the Kipchak tribal confederation.
 Ayub Khan (actor) (born 1969), Indian film and television actor best known for his role in the television series Uttaran.
 Ayub Khan (Emir of Afghanistan) (1857–1914), Emir of Afghanistan who fought against the British Empire in the  Second Anglo-Afghan War.
 Ayub Khan (President of Pakistan) (1907–1974), Pakistani military commander who served as President of Pakistan from 1958 to 1969 following his staging a coup d'état. Previously served as Commander-in-Chief of the Pakistan Army (1951–1958) and Minister of Defence (1954–1955).
 Master Ayub, a Pakistani teacher who runs an open air, free of cost, school in Islamabad since 1986.

Surname
 Gohar Ayub Khan (born 1937), Pakistani military commander, businessman, and politician who served as Minister of Foreign Affairs (1997–1998) and Speaker of the National Assembly (1990–1993); son of the President of Pakistan.
Omar Ayub Khan (born 1970), Pakistani politician,  a member of the National Assembly, son of Gohar Ayub Khan.

See also
Ayub (name)
Eyüp (name), Turkish variant

Pakistani masculine given names